Académica may refer to:

 Academica a Miami, Florida-based charter school operator
 Associação Académica de Coimbra (Coimbra Academic Association), the students' union of the University of Coimbra
 Associação Académica de Coimbra – O.A.F., an autonomous professional football organization of the Associação Académica de Coimbra and Portuguese football club
 Académica do Mindelo, a football organization in São Vicente Island, Cape Verde
 Académica do Sal, a football organization in Espargos, Sal Island, Cape Verde
 Academica (Gyldendal), a publisher in the Gyldendal Akademisk Group, a Danish publishing house
 Académica da Praia, a football organization in Santiago Island, Cape Verde
 Académica Maputo, a football organization in Mozambique